The 2021 All England Open (officially known as the Yonex All England Open Badminton Championships 2021 for sponsorship reasons) was a badminton tournament which took place at Utilita Arena Birmingham in England from 17 to 21 March 2021. It had a total purse of $850,000.

Tournament 
The 2021 All England Open became the second tournament of the 2021 BWF World Tour following the postponement of the 2021 German Open due to the ongoing pandemic. It was part of the All England Open championships, which had been held since 1899. This tournament was organized by Badminton England and sanctioned by the BWF.

Venue 
This international tournament was held at Utilita Arena Birmingham in Birmingham, England.

Point distribution 
Below is the point distribution for each phase of the tournament based on the BWF points system for the BWF World Tour Super 1000 event. This tournament would not be calculated in qualification ranking of 2020 Summer Olympics.

Prize money 
The total prize money for this tournament was US$850,000. Distribution of prize money was in accordance with BWF regulations.

Controversies
On 17 March 2021 night local time, BWF stated that all Indonesian players competing in the tournament, including all three who had won in the first round, were withdrawn from the tournament after 20 of 24 people from the team were contacted by the NHS Test and Trace service via e-mail, and were required to enter 10-day isolation. They were contacted by the NHS after someone on the same inbound flight from Istanbul to Birmingham with the team was tested positive for COVID-19. The entire team was forced to walk on foot from the arena to the hotel as their shuttle service was prevented from taking them to the hotel.

This sparked controversy between Indonesian players and the BWF. The Indonesians protested because 3 Indian players who are tested positive before the tournament, though 24 hours later tested negative after self testing, were allowed to play on the tournament, while all of Indonesian team members had tested negative for the virus. The start of the tournament itself had been delayed for five hours after 7 of COVID-19 results were deemed inconclusive. The Badminton Association of Indonesia (PBSI) also stated that Turkish badminton player Neslihan Yiğit and her trainer who were on the same flight with the Indonesian team from Istanbul to Birmingham, but Yiğit was allowed to continue her tournament. On 18 March noon local time, Yiğit was announced to had also been withdrawn from the tournament by the BWF.

Earlier, the first round of the men's doubles between Indonesians Mohammad Ahsan and Hendra Setiawan and English pair Ben Lane and Sean Vendy sparked backlashes because of an arrangement where the service judge on duty, Alan Crow, was also English. However, according to the rules, BWF never explicitly prohibits a technical official to officiate a match involving athletes from the same country with the technical official against athletes from another country.

Indonesian National Olympic Committee also alleged unprofessional and discriminatory treatment by BWF, as Indonesian team are not allowed to use lifts and take the bus by the organizers. On 22 March, the president of BWF Poul-Erik Høyer Larsen officially apologizes to Indonesian Youth and Sports Minister for the circumstances faced by Indonesian team during the event.

Men's singles

Seeds 

 Kento Momota (quarter-finals)
 Viktor Axelsen (final)
 Anders Antonsen (semi-finals)
 Anthony Sinisuka Ginting (first round)
 Jonatan Christie (second round)
 Lee Zii Jia (champion)
 Rasmus Gemke (second round)
 Srikanth Kidambi (first round)

Finals

Top half

Section 1

Section 2

Bottom half

Section 3

Section 4

Women's singles

Seeds 

 Carolina Marín  (withdrew)
 Nozomi Okuhara (champion)
 Akane Yamaguchi (quarter-finals)
 Ratchanok Intanon (semi-finals)
 P. V. Sindhu (semi-finals)
 Pornpawee Chochuwong (final)
 Mia Blichfeldt (quarter-finals)
 Busanan Ongbamrungphan (quarter-finals)

Finals

Top half

Section 1

Section 2

Bottom half

Section 3

Section 4

Men's doubles

Seeds 

 Marcus Fernaldi Gideon / Kevin Sanjaya Sukamuljo (second round)
 Mohammad Ahsan / Hendra Setiawan (second round)
 Takeshi Kamura / Keigo Sonoda (final)
 Hiroyuki Endo / Yuta Watanabe (champions)
 Fajar Alfian / Muhammad Rian Ardianto (withdrew)
 Satwiksairaj Rankireddy / Chirag Shetty (second round)
 Goh V Shem / Tan Wee Kiong (second round)
 Marcus Ellis / Chris Langridge (quarter-finals)

Finals

Top half

Section 1

Section 2

Bottom half

Section 3

Section 4

Women's doubles

Seeds 

 Yuki Fukushima / Sayaka Hirota (final)
 Mayu Matsumoto / Wakana Nagahara (champions)
 Greysia Polii / Apriyani Rahayu (withdrew)
 Jongkolphan Kititharakul / Rawinda Prajongjai (first round)
 Nami Matsuyama / Chiharu Shida (semi-finals)
 Gabriela Stoeva / Stefani Stoeva (second round)
 Chloe Birch / Lauren Smith (quarter-finals)
 Maiken Fruergaard / Sara Thygesen (quarter-finals)

Finals

Top half

Section 1

Section 2

Bottom half

Section 3

Section 4

Mixed doubles

Seeds 

 Praveen Jordan / Melati Daeva Oktavianti (withdrew)
 Yuta Watanabe / Arisa Higashino (champions)
 Chan Peng Soon / Goh Liu Ying (semi-finals)
 Marcus Ellis / Lauren Smith (semi-finals)
 Goh Soon Huat / Shevon Jemie Lai (first round)
 Tan Kian Meng / Lai Pei Jing (quarter-finals)
 Thom Gicquel / Delphine Delrue (quarter-finals)
 Chris Adcock / Gabby Adcock (withdrew)

Finals

Top half

Section 1

Section 2

Bottom half

Section 3

Section 4

References

External links
 Tournament Link
 Official Website

All England Open Badminton Championships
All England Open
All England
All England
International sports competitions in Birmingham, West Midlands
Sports controversies